Pazhaniappa Kalloori is a 2007 Indian Tamil-language drama film written and directed by R. Pavan and produced by Anbalaya Films. The film stars Pradeep, Arjumman Mughal, Madhu Shalini and Akshaya Rao in lead roles. It was released on 21 December 2007.

Cast

Pradeep as Parthi
Arjumman Mughal as Priya
Madhu Shalini as Malli
Akshaya Rao as Madonna
Ghajini as Dharani
Ganja Karuppu
Ganeshkar
Rohini as Parthi's mother
Shakeela as Chechi
Pandu as Professor
Chitra Lakshmanan as Music teacher
Krishnamoorthy as Police officer
Vijay Krishnaraj
Prem Kumar

Production
The film was first announced by Anbalaya Films in September 2004 under the title of Pasanga, Ponnunga, Oru College. Film Institute graduate R. Pavan was revealed to be the director, with R. P. Patnaik as composer and G. B. Krishna as cinematographer. Production delays meant that the film progressed slowly, though by early 2007, Naveen Chandra and Akshaya Rao had joined the cast. Chandra was credited as Pradeep in the film. Arjumman Mughal and Madhu Shalini later also joined the cast.

Sivakasi Jayalakshmi, who received media attention in 2004 for having relationships with eight policemen, was cast in a supporting role in the film as a tea stall owner. She later opted out of the project following a few days of shoot, citing she was keen to stay away from the film industry, and was replaced by Shakeela.

The film was largely shot at A. V. C. College in Mayiladuthurai, with the producer keen to emulate the success of a previous college love story Oru Thalai Ragam (1980), which was also shot at the college. The shoot of the film also proceeded in neighbouring towns such as Tharangambadi and Thirukkadaiyur.

Soundtrack
Soundtrack was composed by R. P. Patnaik in his second Tamil film after Jayam (2003).
Parangimalai - Silambarasan
Vayasu Pasangala - Karthik
En Meesai Suriyan - Madhangi
Pattam Poochi - Tippu
Vaa Endral - Tippu
Goyango - Malathi
Wine shopla - R. p. Patnaik

Reception
The film was released on 21 December 2007 across Tamil Nadu, after skipping its initial release date of Diwali 2007. S. R. Ashok Kumar of The Hindu opined that "Director Pavan should have burnt the midnight oil more to do the script, packing it with enough incidents with twist and turns to sustain audience interest. As it is his first film one can pardon him, but will the audience?" A reviewer from ChennaiOnline noted "the film, which seems like mindless entertainment during the first half, takes a more serious turn in the second, with a message weaved in" and that the story "depicts a typical college campus with characters and incidents that we have seen in many earlier campus films". A reviewer from Webdunia criticised Anbalaya Films for producing a film full of fighting, smoking and drinking scenes.

A reviewer from Behindwoods.com noted "you know what to expect from a movie that has a college backdrop", while recommending other Indian films released on the day ahead of Pazhaniappa Kalloori. The film did not perform well commercially, with the Times of India calling it a "debacle".

References

External links

2007 films
2007 drama films
Indian drama films
2000s Tamil-language films